Thruston is a surname and may refer to:  

Buckner Thruston (1763–1845), U.S. Senator and federal judge, father of Charles Mynn (Union general) 
Charles Mynn Thruston (colonel) (1738–1812), colonel of a Continental Army regiment, father of Buckner
Charles Mynn Thruston (1798–1873), brigadier general in the Union Army 
Gates P. Thruston (1835-1912), American lawyer, businessman and collector
Thruston may refer to people with the first or middle name Thruston:

S. Thruston Ballard (1855–1926), lieutenant governor of Kentucky
Thruston Ballard Morton (1907–1982), Congressman from Kentucky

Military
Thruston's Additional Continental Regiment, an American infantry unit in the American Revolutionary War

See also 
 Joseph T. Threston (b. ca. 1935), American systems engineer

English-language surnames